NOISE (stylized as N O I S E) is a compilation album released by Adult Swim. It was curated by Laura Sterritt and incorporates a wide variety of styles within the genre of noise music.

Track listing
 Clipping. feat. SICKNESS – Body for the Pile (4:24)
 Melt-Banana – Case D in the Test Tube (1:58)
 EYE – Mega Equipment for Popsicle (4:47)
 Vessel – PRIHATIN (3:44)
 Sadaf – The Clinic (3:55)
 Arca – Bussy (1:53)
 Pharmakon – Squall (6:49)
 Tanya Tagaq – Erie Changys (4:04)
 BEAST – You've Got Rabies on Your Breath (12:01)
 Dreamcrusher – Sick World (3:24)
 Perc – Porthia (5:10)
 Noveller – Processional (4:03)
 Merzbow – For Adult (16:55)
 Prurient – Everything You Know Is Wrong (7:38)
 Hassan Khan – Casiotone Gigantija (3:36)
 Wolf Eyes – Subterranean Life (18:44)

References

External links
Stream or download NOISE at Adult Swim
NOISE at SoundCloud

Albums free for download by copyright owner
Adult Swim compilation albums
Williams Street Records compilation albums
2016 compilation albums